Gymnures, also called hairy hedgehogs or moonrats, are mammals belonging to the subfamily Galericinae, in the family Erinaceidae and the order Eulipotyphla.  Gymnures resemble rats but are not closely related as they are not rodents; they are instead closely related to hedgehogs, which also belong to Erinaceidae. They are thought to have appeared in Eastern Asia before their closest relatives, and changed little from the original ancestor, which is thought to have been also the ancestor of the shrews.

Description
Although the gymnures are more closely related to the hedgehogs, full-grown gymnures superficially resemble large rats, shrews, and opossums.

The gymnure's body plan is believed to resemble that of the earliest mammals, with a large, toothy head about 1/3 the length of the total body, a naked furless tail for balance and thermoregulatory purposes, and a plantigrade stance. In direct contrast to the closely related hedgehogs, gymnures are not spiny.

They also have an outstanding sense of smell, and tactile response in the snout region.

Distribution and habitat
Gymnures inhabit moist jungle terrain in various locales of Southeast Asia, including Vietnam, Sumatra, China and the Malay Peninsula.

Behaviour
Gymnures are primarily carnivorous. They are nocturnal or crepuscular: they come out to forage at twilight or in the night to search the forest floor, using smell to find the animals that they eat. Gymnures eat various arthropods, mice, small reptiles and amphibians, with occasional fruit and fungi.

Gymnures keep territories, and individuals are solitary except when breeding. Gymnures have a very strong scent, typically described as a rancid garlic or onion smell, which is produced by its territory-marking scent glands. Several creatures similar in form and niche, such as the opossum and solenodon,  have an odor similar to the gymnure's.

Classification
This subfamily has alternately been called Echinosoricinae, Galericinae, and Hylomyinae. Some researchers prefer Hylomyinae because the specific relationships of the extinct genus Galerix to living erinaceids are uncertain.
There are ten extant species in five genera:
Genus Echinosorex
Echinosorex gymnura (moonrat)
Genus Hylomys
Hylomys megalotis (Long-eared gymnure)
Hylomys parvus (dwarf gymnure)
Hylomys suillus (short-tailed gymnure or lesser moonrat)
Genus Neohylomys
Neohylomys hainanensis (Hainan gymnure or Hainan moonrat)
Genus Neotetracus
Neotetracus sinensis (shrew gymnure)
Genus Podogymnura
Podogymnura aureospinula (Dinagat gymnure or Dinagat moonrat)
Podogymnura intermedia (Eastern Mindanao gymnure )
Podogymnura minima
Podogymnura truei (Mindanao gymnure or Mindanao moonrat)

References